Founded in 1855, the Amateur Dramatic Club (or ADC) is the oldest university dramatic society in England – and the largest dramatic society in Cambridge.

The club stages a diverse range of productions every term, many of them at the fully equipped ADC Theatre in Park Street, where they are the resident company. They also regularly stage shows at other Cambridge venues, annually at the Edinburgh Fringe and occasionally on tour abroad.

History

The Cambridge University Amateur Dramatic Club was officially founded during the Easter Vacation of 1855 by F.C. Burnand and a group of his friends, who had acquired back rooms in the Hoop Hotel on Jesus Lane during the course of the previous year.
The university's response to the project was reported to have been ‘unfavourable’, but this did nothing to dampen the enthusiasm of those involved.
The club's first presentation was a series of short one act plays of varying quality, of which the club's first minute book reports that ‘the receipts were scanty, but a start was effected’.

Over the course of the next five years, the society grew slowly but steadily.
A contribution of £5 from each of the club's members allowed the club to pay for the renovation of their cramped and bare rooms, and in 1860 the new stage at the Hoop Hotel, roughly on the site of the current building, was opened.

Though the university's approval was initially begrudging, attitudes towards the club changed over the course of the next 40 years, and by the beginning of the 20th century the club was a nationally renowned and respected group.
Tragedy struck in 1933 when the Hoop Hotel stage was destroyed in a fire.
Support flooded in, including messages of goodwill from the King, and a mere 18 months later a new building was opened by the club.
The ADC Theatre, now the oldest university playhouse in the country, was reborn.

The club continued to run the theatre until it ran into financial difficulties in 1974 when the university took over the running of the theatre, as a department of the university leasing the building from the club for a nominal annual fee.

Activities
The CUADC puts on around 20 shows every year. These cover a huge range of subject matter and playwrights, from comic to tragic, from Chaucer to Stoppard via Shakespeare and Beckett to name just a few. Although many are performed at the 228-seater ADC Theatre, where the club is the resident performing company, recent venues have also included the Corpus Christi Playroom, The Octagon at St Chad's, King's College Lawn and the Round Church.

Constitutionally, the club also has an obligation
to spread interest in the theory and practice of theatre, in all its aspects, by every possible means amongst those qualified to be members of the Club; to encourage the active involvement of the same regardless of previous experience; and to maintain interest in the running of the ADC Theatre.

To this end, the club puts on a programme of professional and student-run workshops for actors, directors and technicians as well as a series of late-night experimental pieces known as One Night Stands.

Membership
Anybody aged 17 or over, studying for a qualification at the University of Cambridge, or who is engaged in full-time study at any other educational institution within Cambridge is eligible for ordinary membership.
From time to time special membership may be conferred onto people who do not otherwise qualify for ordinary membership.
It is a requirement that anybody participating in a show put on by the club must have some class of membership status for insurance reasons.

Committee
The club is run on behalf of its members by a committee of fourteen students of the university.
The President usually must have been a member of the committee the previous year and is elected by that committee, all other roles are elected by club members at the AGM, held in Lent Term.
The committee is in charge of show selection and support, as well as organisation of one-off events such as the annual garden party, annual dinner, and freshers' squash.

There is also a senior treasurer, who, by university statutes, must be a senior member of the university. This post is currently held by Dr Richard Barnes, the vice-master of Emmanuel College and senior treasurer of Amalgamated Clubs.

Past members
Alumni include:
Peter Hall
Richard Eyre
Trevor Nunn
Ian McKellen
Derek Jacobi
Michael Redgrave
David Hare – club hiring manager 1968 
Corin Redgrave
Emma Thompson
Nicholas Hytner
Simon Russell Beale
Eleanor Bron
Sam Mendes
Tom Hollander
Miriam Margolyes
Griff Rhys Jones
Rachel Weisz
Sacha Baron Cohen
Clive Swift
Terrence Hardiman
Eddie Redmayne
Tom Hiddleston

References

External links
 CUADC website

Drama
Amateur theatre companies in England
Student theatre in the United Kingdom
Arts organizations established in 1855
Theatre in Cambridge
1855 establishments in England